Domažlice is a town in the Plzeň Region of the Czech Republic. It has about 11,000 inhabitants. The historic town centre is well preserved and is protected by law as an urban monument reservation.

Administrative parts

The town is made up of six town parts: Bezděkovské Předměstí, Dolejší Předměstí, Havlovice, Hořejší Předměstí, Město and Týnské Předměstí.

Geography
It lies on the Radbuza River. It lies on the Zubřina stream. It is situated in the Upper Palatine Forest Foothills.

History
The first written mention of Domažlice settlement is in a deed of Duke Boleslaus II from 993. Purpose of its existence was related to the Bohemian-Bavarian border and important trade route to Regensburg.

Near that settlement, a fortified royal town of Domažlice was founded by Ottokar II of Bohemia in 1265. The town included a royal castle. The border with Bavaria was protected by border guards recruited from Chodové (Slavic free farmers) who settled in the vicinity of Domažlice.

The town was mortgaged to Bavaria in 1331, lasting until 1419 (with some interruptions). Under Hussite rule, German citizens were expelled from the town, and since then, the population has been predominantly Czech. In 1431, Prokop the Great defeated the crusaders of the Holy Roman Empire in the Battle of Domažlice. The 15th and 16th centuries saw Domažlice change hands frequently, but its importance diminished following the end of the Thirty Years' War. It was not until 1770 that it recovered, largely due to innovations in the textile industry.

Until 1918 the town was part of the Austrian monarchy, finding itself on the Austrian side of the Austro-Hungarian internal frontier following the Austro-Hungarian Compromise of 1867. It was the district capital of the district with the same name, being one of the 94 Bezirkshauptmannschaften (district capitals) in Bohemia.

Within the context of the Czech National Revival, Domažlice became a central place during the 19th century. At the time, it was the westernmost ethnic Czech town, very close to the border with the Kingdom of Bavaria. In the town, a pilgrimage took place on 13 August 1939, which developed into a large Czech protest demonstration against the German occupation and control of the ethnic Czech Protectorate of Bohemia and Moravia. The German population was expelled in 1945 according to the Potsdam Agreement.

In 2005 a mass grave was discovered on the outskirts of the town. It contained 54 Germans, which could be mainly members of the local SA, executed by the Czech resistance at the end of the World War II.

Demographics

Sport
A local football club, TJ Jiskra Domažlice, plays in the Bohemian Football League (3rd tier of the Czech football league system).

The Sněhaři Domažlice ski club was founded in 1912 and restored in 1996.

Sights

The historical core of Domažlice is well preserved and includes many monuments and valuable buildings. The old town was defined by walls, of which fragments and the early Gothic gate (so-called Dolejší, i.e. "Lower") have been preserved. Most of the houses are Gothic and Renaissance buildings from the 14th–16th centuries with Neoclassical façades. The architecturally valuable Neorenaissance town hall on the town square dates from 1890–1893.

In the centre of the town square there is the Church of the Nativity of the Virgin Mary. It was first mentioned in 1385. It was baroque rebuilt in 1751–1756, but retained Gothic elements.

The former Augustinian monastery is a landmark of the western part of the town square. The monastery was founded in 1287. After it was destroyed during the Hussite Wars, it was restored in 1671–1746. Today the building serves as an elementary art school. The neighbouring monastery Church of the Assumption of the Virgin Mary from the 14th century was rebuilt in the Baroque style in 1746–1752, further reconstructions took place in 1774 and 1892–1893.

Chodský Castle was founded together with the town in the 1260s. Until the early 16th century, it had the function of an administrative seat. It became a ruin after two fires in the 16th century. In 1726–1728, a salt storage was built on the site of the castle, designed by Kilian Ignaz Dientzenhofer. A perimeter wall and a cylindrical tower have been preserved from the original castle. In the second half of the 19th century, it served as the municipal office. During the 20th century, the building gradually became the seat of the Museum of Chodsko Region. The tower is open to the public as a lookout tower.

The Church of Saint Lawrence on the hill Veselá hora is a pilgrimage site. It was built in 1685 and rebuilt in 1775.

Notable people
Božena Němcová (1820–1862), writer
Ladislav Klíma (1878–1928), philosopher and novelist
Václav Melzer (1878–1968), mycologist
František Michl (1901–1977), painter and graphic artist
Jan Smudek (1915–1999), resistance fighter
Václav Jehlička (born 1948), politician
Jiří Vaněk (born 1978), tennis player and coach
Karel Novy (born 1980), Swiss swimmer

Twin towns – sister cities

Domažlice is twinned with:
 Furth bei Göttweig, Austria
 Furth im Wald, Germany
 Ludres, France
 Two Rivers, United States

References

External links

Information service of Domažlice

 
Populated places in Domažlice District
Cities and towns in the Czech Republic